Henry IV at the Battle of Ivry is a 1627 oil on canvas by the artist Peter Paul Rubens, measuring 367 by 693 cm. It shows Henry IV of France at Ivry and forms a pair with The Triumphal Entry of Henry IV into Paris - both were bought by Cosimo III de' Medici in 1686. They are both now in the Uffizi Gallery in Florence, where they have been since 1773.

External links
http://www.virtualuffizi.com/uffizi1/Uffizi_Pictures.asp?Contatore=436 

1627 paintings
Paintings by Peter Paul Rubens
Paintings in the collection of the Uffizi
War paintings
Horses in art
Cultural depictions of French kings